The  British Pentathlon is a professional darts event consisting of five different disciplines. It was first established in 1976, run by the British Darts Organisation and subsequently the World Darts Federation. A women's event was established in 2004.

The event is invitational and has twenty competitors. Martin Adams has won it 13 times and John Lowe won it ten times. The women's event has been won eight times by Trina Gulliver. Other multiple winners include Eric Bristow, Phil Taylor, John Walton and Andy Fordham.

Format
The Pentathlon has a unique format among darts events. Competitors play 24 games of darts over the course of the day: a two-legged 501 match against each of the other players (a total of 19 matches), single legs from 1001 and 2001, then games of halve-it, Shanghai and round the board on doubles. Points are awarded based on performances in each of the events. The champion is the player who accumulates the highest number of points.

The Pentathlon has been described as "the toughest and most gruelling darts event on the calendar," whose aim is "to reduce luck to a minimum and ensure that talent, skill and determination are rewarded with success." Trina Gulliver called it "probably the most difficult darts competition ever." Bobby George described it as "like darts' version of Superstars without any cycling, shooting or swimming." He also thought it a "ridiculous event", which "had no appeal to me whatsoever", and "one long, hard, boring slog". John Lowe, on the other hand, enjoyed the event, but eventually stopped playing in it because the prizemoney hadn't increased in years.

Gameplay
The exact rules can vary across events. In the British pentathlon, the rules are as follows:
Each invited player plays each other over two legs from the standard 501 start. Points are awarded for high scoring visits, for completing the leg within a set number of darts, and for winning the leg.
Each player plays a single leg of darts starting starting from both 1001 and 2001. Points are awarded for high scoring visits and there are bonus points for completing the leg within a set number of darts.
Shanghai - The player throws three darts at each segment from 1 through 9. One point is awarded for hitting the correct single number, two for the double and three for the treble. Bonus points are awarded for hitting one single, one double and one treble of the target number ("Shanghai").
Halve it - Players have three darts at each of the designated numbers in turn: 20s, 16s, double 7, 14s, treble 10, 17s, bullseye. Scoring is standard, but as the game progresses, missing a target number results in the player's score being halved. For pentathlon points, players are awarded one point for hitting each correct single, two for a double, three for a treble and two for a bullseye.
Round the board on doubles - Players have 42 darts to hit every double on the board starting on 1 and continuing sequentially until 20. Two points are awarded for each double hit and bonus points are awarded for completing the challenge with darts to spare.

British Pentathlon winners

Men

Women

References

Darts variants
British Darts Organisation tournaments
1976 establishments in England
Recurring sporting events established in 1976
Darts in the United Kingdom